Jeanette Mott Oxford (born July 16, 1954) is an American activist and politician from Missouri. She is a currently the Executive Director of the Missouri Association for Social Welfare, after having served as a member of the Missouri House of Representatives, representing a portion of St. Louis. A Democrat, she was the first openly lesbian member of the Missouri Legislature.

Biography
Oxford was born in Eldorado, Illinois and graduated from Cave-in-Rock High School in Cave-in-Rock, Illinois.  She received an Associate of Arts degree from Southeastern Illinois College in Harrisburg, Illinois in 1974 and a Bachelor of Arts degree from Southern Illinois University-Carbondale in 1986.

Oxford attended Eden Theological Seminary in Webster Groves, Missouri and graduated with her Master of Divinity in 1989. Prior to her political career, Oxford served as executive director of the Reform Organization of Welfare (ROWEL) and as a grassroots coordinator for the American Lung Association, both in St. Louis.

Oxford's political career began in 2000, when she sought election to the Missouri House of Representatives. She narrowly lost the Democratic primary election to Russ Carnahan. In 2004, Carnahan gave up the State Representative seat to run for Congress. She ran again for the seat, and was successful. She won in a three-way Democratic primary in August 2004, and obtained almost 90% of the vote against a Libertarian opponent in the November 2004 general election.

Oxford won re-nomination as the Democratic party candidate in the August 2006 primary, obtaining 81% of the vote against opponent Mark Rice, who also opposed her in the three-way August 2004 primary. She faced only a Libertarian opponent in the November 2006 general election and won by more than eight-to-one. She faced no primary opposition in 2008, though a Libertarian filed to run against her in November. She ran unopposed for re-election in 2010 and was elected to a final term in the House. Term limits prevented her from seeking a fifth term in 2012.

Oxford is an active member of Epiphany United Church of Christ in St. Louis, and resides in the Benton Park neighborhood with her partner, Dorothy. She was one of three openly gay members of the Missouri General Assembly, serving alongside Sen. Jolie Justus (D–Kansas City) and Rep. Mike Colona (D–St. Louis). Her campaigns won the backing of the Gay & Lesbian Victory Fund.

References

External links
Profile, Missouri Association for Social Welfare official website; accessed November 25, 2014. 
 Profile, house.mo.gov/billtracking; accessed November 25, 2014.
 Profile , semissourian.com; accessed November 25, 2014
 Profile, votesmart.org; accessed November 25, 2014.

Lesbian politicians
LGBT Protestants
LGBT state legislators in Missouri
LGBT people from Illinois
Members of the Missouri House of Representatives
Politicians from St. Louis
United Church of Christ members
Women state legislators in Missouri
1954 births
Living people
People from Eldorado, Illinois
21st-century American women